The Erbsenmuster or pea pattern was one of a family of German World War II camouflage patterns, said to have been designed by Johann Georg Otto Schick, and first issued to the Waffen-SS in 1944. The pattern had five colours, pale brown, dark brown, green, olive green and black, arranged as small rounded areas dotted over large irregular areas.

Development
It was developed from Eichenlaubmuster, the oak leaf pattern.
Its style was quite unlike earlier German camouflage smocks: unlike them, it was not reversible. 

It was a two piece uniform and could be worn either by itself in warm weather, or over other uniform; the camouflage pattern was intended to be effective all year round.

References

Camouflage patterns
Military camouflage
Military equipment introduced from 1940 to 1944